Feeling Through is a 2019 American short drama film directed by Doug Roland. It was nominated for the 2021 Academy Award for Best Live Action Short Film. Actress Marlee Matlin serves as an executive producer.

Plot
In New York City, a homeless teenager named Tereek is enjoying a late night with his friends. As they go their separate ways, Tereek notices a deaf and blind man named Artie holding a cane and a sign requesting assistance in crossing the street. Tereek hesitantly touches Artie to offer his help, and Artie writes the number of the bus he needs to catch. Tereek guides him to the bus stop and they gradually introduce themselves to one another. Although Tereek receives messages from his girlfriend, who is expecting him, he decides to stay with Artie and make sure he gets on the bus.

Artie tells Tereek that he is thirsty, so they head to a bodega where Tereek uses Artie's money to buy him a drink and himself a candy bar, pocketing $10 in the process. They return to the bus stop but just miss the bus. As they wait, Artie tells Tereek that he was on a date and that he needs to be tapped by the bus driver when he reaches his stop. The bus finally comes and they get on. Tereek tells the driver what Artie needs and the man brusquely agrees to help him. Artie and Tereek assure each other that they will be OK and embrace. When Tereek gets off the bus, he puts the $10 that he took from Artie's wallet into the cup of a sleeping homeless man.

Production history
A story about the unlikely connection between a teen in need and a DeafBlind man, the short film grew from director Doug Roland's encounter with a DeafBlind man in New York City years earlier. The title of Feeling Through is a pun: It is a reference to the DeafBlind community, which is at the heart of the film, as members of that community navigate the world through touch, while the metaphorical meaning refers to the protagonist's personal journey of having to carefully learn how to open his heart without necessarily knowing how to.

Realizing in that one interaction he went from seeing Artemio as his disability to seeing him as a friend inspired the story for what eventually became Feeling Through.

Roland partnered with the Helen Keller National Center in order to make the film and cast a DeafBlind actor in a lead role, which is a first in film history.

Roland also shot a behind-the-scenes documentary along the way, called Connecting the Dots, which follows the process of casting and working with the DeafBlind actor Robert Tarango, who also works at the kitchen of the Helen Keller Center, as well as their year-long search to find the real life Artemio.

Cast
 Steven Prescod as Tereek
 Robert Tarango as Artie
 Francisco Burgos as Clay
 Alestair Shu as J.R.
 Javier Rodriguez as Bodega cashier
 Coffey as Homeless man
 Jose Toro as Sleeping man
 Luis Antonio Aponte as Bus driver

Promotion
In addition to the film's festival run, Roland worked with Helen Keller National Center to create a fully accessible screening event called "The Feeling Through Experience" which included Feeling Through alongside a supporting making-of documentary called Connecting the Dots followed by a panel discussion and Q&A with the DeafBlind community.

Accolades

References

External links

2019 films
American drama films
2019 short films
2019 drama films
Films about deaf people
Films about blind people
2010s English-language films
2010s American films